"(Themes from) The Man with the Golden Arm" is a song written by Elmer Bernstein and performed by Richard Maltby & His Orchestra. It was featured in the 1955 film The Man with the Golden Arm, and reached number 14 on the Billboard chart in 1956.

Other charting versions
Bernstein released a version in 1956 that reached number 16 in the U.S.
Dick Jacobs released a version in 1956 that reached number 22 in the U.S.
Billy May released a version in 1956 that reached number 9 on the UK Singles Chart and number 49 in the U.S.
Les Elgart released a version in 1956 that reached number 56 in the U.S.
Buddy Morrow released a version in 1956 that reached number 82 in the U.S.
Jet Harris released a version in 1962 that reached number 12 in the U.K.

Other versions
Eddie Calvert released a version as a single in 1956, but it did not chart.
Jonah Jones released a version on his 1957 EP Muted Jazz.
Jimmy McGriff released a version as the B-side to his 1964 single "Topkapi".
Billy Strange released a version as the B-side to his 1965 single "Raunchy".
Bill Evans released a version on his 1963 album Plays the Theme from The V.I.P.s and Other Great Songs.
Jimmy Smith released a version on his 1965 album Monster.
The Sweet released a version on their 1974 album Desolation Boulevard.

References

1955 songs
1956 singles
1962 singles
Jimmy Smith (musician) songs
Decca Records singles
Capitol Records singles
Wing Records singles
Sue Records singles
Songs with music by Elmer Bernstein